It Came from Kuchar is a 2009 documentary film about twin underground filmmakers George Kuchar and Mike Kuchar directed by Jennifer Kroot (a former student of George Kuchar at the San Francisco Art Institute) and produced by Tigerlily Films LLC. The film includes commentary by John Waters, Christopher Coppola, Wayne Wang, B. Ruby Rich, Atom Egoyan, Guy Maddin, Bill Griffith, and Buck Henry.

Funding for the film came from the Andy Warhol Foundation, Creative Work Fund, The Fleishhacker Foundation, San Francisco Arts Commission, and Frameline.

Premier 
The film premiered at the South by Southwest film festival in Austin, Texas on March 14, 2009, and was shown at Frameline in San Francisco and at CineVegas in June 2009, and at Outfest in July 2009.

Cast 
As themselves:

George Kuchar
Mike Kuchar
Buck Henry
John Waters
B. Ruby Rich
Atom Egoyan
Wayne Wang
Cory McAbee
Guy Maddin
Christopher Coppola
Donna Kerness
Bill Griffith
Gerard Malanga
Jeffrey Schwarz
David Weissman
Larry Leibowitz
Lawrence Jordan
John Carlson
Bob Cowan
Dan Carbone
Floraine Connors
Mike Diana
Linda Martinez
Melinda McDowell-Milks
Andy Rodriguez
V. Vale
Marian Wallace

Reception 
The film has received a majority of favorable reviews. Rotten Tomatoes currently gives the film a 94 percent positive rating, 15 positive reviews out of 16, with an average rating of 7.5/10.

References

External links
 

Review at Film Threat
Review at Austin Chronicle

2009 films
Documentary films about film directors and producers
American documentary films
2009 documentary films
2000s English-language films
2000s American films